John Osborne Whitehouse (July 19, 1817 – August 24, 1881) was a U.S. Representative from New York.

Biography 
John O. Whitehouse was born in Rochester, New Hampshire on July 19, 1817. He received a common-school education and moved to New York City in 1835, where he worked as a clerk. In 1839, he moved to Brooklyn, New York, where he was engaged as a merchant and manufacturer of shoes. He moved to Poughkeepsie, New York, in 1860 and continued the shoe manufacturing business.

Whitehouse was elected as a Democrat to the Forty-third and Forty-fourth Congresses (March 4, 1873 – March 3, 1877). He served as chairman of the Committee on Reform in the Civil Service (Forty-fourth Congress). He was not a candidate for reelection in 1876 to the Forty-fifth Congress. He resumed the shoe manufacturing business. He was also interested in banking and railroading. He was owner of the Daily News 1872–1880.

Death and burial 
He died in Poughkeepsie, New York, August 24, 1881. He was interred in Green-Wood Cemetery, Brooklyn, New York.

Sources

External links 
 

1817 births
1881 deaths
Burials at Green-Wood Cemetery
People from Rochester, New Hampshire
Democratic Party members of the United States House of Representatives from New York (state)
19th-century American journalists
American male journalists
19th-century American male writers
19th-century American politicians